is a condominium complex located in the Kachidoki district of Chūō, Tokyo, Japan. The complex is situated at the confluence of the southwestern section of the Sumida River and Tokyo Bay.

The complex consists of two towers: The southern  on the ocean-facing side and the downtown-facing north . The two outwardly similar towers are currently the second-tallest condominium buildings in Japan, as well as each tower individually containing the most number of floors for a Japanese condominium at 58 apiece.

Other facilities include a golf range, a collection of low-rise buildings housing sports and fitness amenities, and the  alongside the neighboring canal.

Approximately 8,000 people are eventually expected to inhabit the complex. Unit prices ranged from ¥39 million to ¥216 million.

Construction
Height: 193.50 m (2 underground, 58 above ground, 1 tower level)
Households: 2,794 (Owned: 1,981, Rented: 813)
Site area: 29,718.37 m²
Building area: 20,663.65 m²
Total floor space: 383,345.47 m²

Mid Tower
Households: 1,461 (Owned: 648, Rented: 813)
Site area: 12,690.69 m²
Building area: 9,453.76 m²
Total floor space: 183,585.55 m²

Sea Tower
Households: 1,333 (Owned: 100%)
Site area: 17,027.68 m²
Building area: 11,209.89 m²
Total floor space: 199,759.92 m²

References

External links 

 The Tokyo Towers for Rent 

Buildings and structures in Chūō, Tokyo
Residential buildings completed in 2008
Residential skyscrapers in Tokyo
Twin towers
2008 establishments in Japan